Ima Machet Icha Tangkhai (English: Partly Mother, Half Child) is a 2021 Indian Meitei language film directed by Homeshwori and produced by Chingsubam Khumanleima for Luwang Films. It stars Gokul Athokpam, Gurumayum Bonny, Abenao Elangbam, Soma Laishram and Luwangthoibi Chanu. The movie was released on 7 November 2021 at Manipur State Film Development Society in the Palace Compound, Imphal, with MP and titular king Leishemba Sanajaoba attending as the chief guest.

Cast
 Gokul Athokpam as Thambal's husband
 Gurumayum Bonny as Thabatombi's father
 Abenao Elangbam as Thambal
 Soma Laishram as Thabatombi's mother
 Luwangthoibi Chanu as Thabatombi (dual role)
 Idhou (Chakpram Rameshchandra) as Lukhoi
 Ningthoujam Jayvidya
 Takhellambam Lokendro
 Longjam Ongbi Lalitabi
 Santajit

Soundtrack
Nongmaithem Ibomcha and Nanao Sagolmang composed the soundtrack for the film. The lyrics were written by Biramangol Mekola and Rajmani Ayekpam. The two songs in the movie are "Nungshi Nungol Houna Tha" and "Ichadi Chaore".

Reception 
Writing for The Sangai Express, Rajmani Ayekpam opined that "Ima Machet Icha Tangkhai, one of the few films after pandemic is worth mentioning because of both its aesthetic value and entertainment spices."

Accolades

References

External links
 

Meitei-language films
2021 films
Cinema of Manipur